Thomas R. Robinson High School (known as Robinson High School) is a public magnet high school in Tampa, Florida. It is one of the four high schools in the county that offers the International Baccalaureate diploma program. The school was established in 1959 and is named after Thomas R. Robinson, an educator in Hillsborough County who began teaching in 1917. Robinson High School is the smallest high school and in Hillsborough County. The official mascot of Robinson is the Fighting Knight.

Athletics 
Robinson High School offers many sports including football, flag-football, baseball, basketball, volleyball, tennis, golf, cross country, soccer, lacrosse, and track. Robinson Knights were State Runner-up in football in 1963. The flag-football team have been 5-time State Champions since 2014. The school's rival is Plant High School.

International Baccalaureate Programme 

The school is the third Hillsborough County high school to have an International Baccalaureate Programme, with the other IB schools being C. Leon King High School, Strawberry Crest High School, and Hillsborough High School (Tampa, Florida). The program was established in the 2006–2007 school year and offers a Pre-IB curriculum for grades 9 and 10, and an IB Diploma Programme for grades 11 and 12. Robinson received the status of a full-fledged IB diploma school for the 2008–2009 school year.  The first class of IB students graduated in 2010.

Only 150 spots are open every year for Robinson High's IB program. Robinson High School also had the highest number of National Merit semi finalists in Hillsborough County in 2015.

Notable alumni
Delbert Alvarado - NFL player
Javier Arenas - NFL player
Charlie Bradley - basketball player
Janet Cruz - Florida State Senator 
Greg Ellingson - NFL player
Mike Graham - professional wrestler
Bruce Hector - NFL player
Hulk Hogan - professional wrestler and actor
Austin Idol - professional wrestler
Steve Keirn - professional wrestler
Joep Lange - HIV/AIDS researcher
Byron Pringle - NFL Player
John Reaves - NFL player
Dirty Dick Slater - professional wrestler
Larry Smith - NFL player
Matt Vogler - football player
Frankie Williams - NFL player

References

External links 
 Robinson High School (HCPS) School website.
 T.R. Robinson High School Alumni Association Official RHS Alumni Association website.


High schools in Tampa, Florida
Public high schools in Florida
1959 establishments in Florida
Educational institutions established in 1959